This is a list of programs produced, distributed or owned by 20th Television, a subsidiary of Disney Television Studios.

Television series

Television series from related studios

20th Television Animation

Touchstone Television
Also includes productions from Fox Television Studios, Fox 21 Television Studios and Fox 21. Now absorbed into 20th Television.

Regency Television

Foxstar Productions

20th Television (distribution arm)
COPS (1989–2013) (distribution for pre-Spike episodes)
The Bertice Berry Show (1993–1994)
The Gordon Elliott Show (1994–1997) (produced by CBS Entertainment Productions)
Sherman Oaks (1995–1997)
The Magic Hour (1998) (co-produced by Magic Johnson Entertainment)
Forgive or Forget (1998–2000) (co-produced by Jonathan Goodson Productions)
Greed (1999–2000) (co-production with Dick Clark Productions)
Divorce Court (1999–2019) (transferred to Fox First Run starting in Fall 2019)
Power of Attorney (2000–2002)
Texas Justice (2001–2005)
Ambush Makeover (2004–2005)
Judge Alex (2005–2014)
The Ricki Lake Show (revival of 1993–2004 series, 2012–2013)
Family Feud (2007–2019)
The Morning Show with Mike and Juliet (2007–2009)
Temptation (2007–2008) (produced by FremantleMedia)
Are You Smarter than a 5th Grader? (2009–2011) (Produced by Mark Burnett Productions and Zoo Productions)
Don't Forget the Lyrics! (2010–2011) (produced by RDF Media USA)
Dish Nation (2012–2019) (transferred to Fox First Run starting in Fall 2019)
Page Six TV (2017–2019) (produced by Endemol Shine North America)
25 Words or Less (2018–2019) (transferred to Fox First Run starting in Fall 2019)

Fox Lab

Freeform Group
Note: Formerly known as Fox Family Worldwide and ABC Family Worldwide.

FX Productions

Searchlight Television

Metromedia

Note: Formerly known as Metromedia Pictures Corporation.

New World Television

Four Star Television

MTM Enterprises

Fox Entertainment

Animation Domination High-Def

Fox Television Stations

Fox First Run
NOTE: These shows were formerly distributed by 20th Television, prior to the Disney-Fox merger. Ad sales to Fox syndicated programming is handled by Paramount Global's CBS Media Ventures.

Divorce Court (1999–present)
Dish Nation (2012–present)
25 Words or Less (2019–present)

Television films and specials

20th Television
Note: Formerly known as 20th Century Fox Television.
 The Forest Ranger (1956)
 Operation Cicero (1956)
 Monte Carlo (1961)
 Sally & Sam (1965)
 Batgirl (1968)
 Braddock (1968)
 European Eye (1968)
 The Desperate Mission (1969)
 City Beneath the Sea (1969)
 Anderson and Company (1969)
 The Flim-Flam Man (1969)
 Daughter of the Mind (1969)
 Honeymoon with a Stranger (1969)
 David Copperfield (1969)
 Along Came a Spider (1970)
 The Challenge (1970)
 The Kowboys (1970)
 Southern Fried (1970)
 Three Coins in the Fountain (1970)
 Prudence and the Chief (1970)
 Tribes (1970)
 Paper Man (1971)
 Mr. and Mrs. Bo Jo Jones (1971)
 They Call It Murder (1971)
 Dead Men Tell No Tales (1971)
 The CBS Late Movie (1972, select movies)
 When Michael Calls (1972)
 Fireball Forward (1972)
 Oh, Nurse! (1972)
 Return to Peyton Place (1972–1974)
 The ABC Saturday Superstar Movie (1972–1973)
 Nanny and the Professor (1972) (co-production with Fred Calvert Productions)
 Lost in Space (1973) (co-production with Hanna-Barbera Productions)
 Nanny and the Professor and the Phantom of the Circus (1973) (co-production with Fred Calvert Productions)
 Pursuit (1972)
 Incident on a Dark Street (1973)
 Going Places (1973)
 RX for Defense (1973)
 The Barbara Eden Show (1973)
 Terror on the Beach (1973)
 Ordeal (1973)
 Blood Sport (1973)
 Miracle on 34th Street (1973)
 The Borrowers (1973)
 Mrs. Sundance (1974)
 Fred Astaire Salutes the Fox Musicals (1974)
 If I Love You, Am I Trapped Forever? (1974)
 Remember When (1974)
 Big Rose: Double Trouble (1974)
 A Tree Grows in Brooklyn (1974) (remake of the classic film of the same name)
 The Mark of Zorro (1974)
 The Red Badge of Courage (1974)
 Stowaway to the Moon (1975)
 The Trial of Chaplin Jensen (1975)
 Adventures of the Queen (1975)
 At Long Last Cole (1975)
 A Girl Named Sooner (1975)
 State Fair (1976)
 Dead on Target (1976)
 Time Travelers (1976)
 The Cheerleaders (1976)
 Jeremiah of Jacob's Neck (1976)
 Wanted: The Sundance Woman (1976)
 Sherlock Holmes in New York (1976)
 Life Goes to the Movies (1976)
 Raid on Entebbe (1977)
 A Circle of Children (1977)
 Spectre (1977)
 Good Against Evil (1977)
 James at 15 (1977)
 The Making of Star Wars (1977) (co-production with Lucasfilm, Ltd.)
 Life Goes to War: Hollywood and the Home Front (1977)
 Murder in Peyton Place (1977)
 Christmas Miracle in Caufield, U.S.A. (1977)
 Ring of Passion (1978)
 Husbands, Wives & Lovers (1978)
 Mother, Juggs & Speed (August 17, 1978)
 A Guide for the Married Woman (1978)
 The Nativity (1978)
 Star Wars Holiday Special (1978)
 Like Normal People (1979)
 Swan Song (1980)
 The Day Christ Died (1980)
 Jake's Way (1980)
 Tourist (1980)
 The Diary of Anne Frank (1980)
 SP FX: The Empire Strikes Back (1980) (co-production with Lucasfilm, Ltd.)
 Word of Honor (1981)
 Jacqueline Susann's Valley of the Dolls (1981)
 Aliens from Another Planet (1982)
 The Day the Bubble Burst (1982)
 Tomorrow's Child (1982)
 The Rules of Marriage (1982)
 Sister Sister (1982)
 Rooster (1982)
 Kentucky Woman (1983)
 Love Is Forever (1983)
 Blood Feud (1983)
 For Love and Honor (1983)
 Manimal (1983)
 Classic Creatures: Return of the Jedi (1983) (co-production with Lucasfilm, Ltd.)
 From Star Wars to Jedi: The Making of a Saga (1983) (co-production with Lucasfilm, Ltd.)
 Helen Keller: The Miracle Continues (1984)
 W*A*L*T*E*R (1984)
 Love Thy Neighbor (1984)
 Cover Up (1984)
 Sentimental Journey (1984)
 The Sun Also Rises (1984)
 Caravan of Courage: An Ewok Adventure (1984) (co-production with Lucasfilm, Ltd. and Korty Films)
 Half Nelson (1985)
 Peyton Place: The Next Generation (1985)
 Goodbye Charlie (1985)
 Covenant (1985)
 In Like Flynn (1985)
 Murder: By Reason of Insanity (1985)
 A Letter to Three Wives (1985)
 Ewoks: The Battle for Endor (1985) (co-production with Lucasfilm, Ltd.)
 A Masterpiece of Murder (1986)
 Popeye Doyle (1986)
 Memories of M*A*S*H (1991)
 The Omen (1995)
The Hunt for the Unicorn Killer (1999) (co-production with Dan Wigutow Productions and Regency Television)
 Olive, the Other Reindeer (1999) (co-production with The Curiosity Company)
 M*A*S*H: 30th Anniversary Reunion (2002)
 RFK (2002) (co-production with Artisan Television)
 The Simpsons 20th Anniversary Special – In 3-D! On Ice! (2010)
 Dan the Weatherman (2018) (co-production with Tomorrow Studios)

Fox Circle Productions/National Studios
 Love and Betrayal: The Mia Farrow Story (1995)
 The O. J. Simpson Story (1995)
 Alien Nation: Millennium (1996)
 If Looks Could Kill (1996)
 Pretty Poison (1996)
 Nick Fury: Agent of S.H.I.E.L.D. (1998)

Touchstone Television
 Gargantua (1998)
 Night of the Headless Horseman  (1999)
 Home Alone 4: Taking Back the House (2002)
 Baywatch: Hawaiian Wedding (2003)
 Return to the Batcave: The Misadventures of Adam and Burt (2003) (co-production with Artisan Entertainment and The Kaufman Company)
 The Muppets' Wizard of Oz (2005) (co-production with The Jim Henson Company and Touchstone Television)
 Romy and Michele: In the Beginning (2005)
 Their Eyes Were Watching God (2005)
 Flight 93 (2006)
 Books of Blood (2020) (co-production with Fuzzy Door Productions, Beetlecod Productions and Seraphin Films); Hulu original film

Foxstar Productions
 The Fantasy Worlds of Irwin Allen (1995)
 A Hollywood Christmas (1996)
 Twentieth Century Fox: The First 50 Years (1997)
 Hidden Hollywood: Treasures from the 20th Century Fox Film Vaults (1997)
 Behind the Planet of the Apes (1998)
 Beyond Titanic (1998)
 Hollywood Screen Tests (1999)
 Boom!: Hollywood's Greatest Disaster Movies (1999)
 Hidden Hollywood II: More Treasures from the 20th Century Fox Vaults (1999)
 Cleopatra: The Film That Changed Hollywood (2000)
 Hollywood at Your Feet : The Story of the Chinese Theatre Footprints (2000)
 Twentieth Century Fox: The Blockbuster Years (2000)
 The Omen Legacy (2001)
 Marilyn Monroe: The Final Days (2001)
 Hollywood Rocks the Movies: The 1970s (2002)
 The 'Alien' Saga (2002)

New World Pictures

MTM Enterprises
 Just an Old Sweet Song (1976)
 Something for Joey (1977)
 First, You Cry (1978)
 Vampire (1979)
 The Boy Who Drank Too Much (1980)
 Thornwell (1981)
 Apollo 11 (1996)
 Night of the Twisters (1996) (co-production with PorchLight Entertainment and Atlantis Films
 Christmas Every Day (1996)

Fox Entertainment
 41st Primetime Emmy Awards (1989)
 The Making of America's Best Television: The Creative Arts Emmy Awards (1991)
 Rolling Stone '93: The Year in Review (1993)
 Madonna: Innocence Lost (1994)
 Love Thy Neighbor: The Baddest and The Best of Melrose Place (1995)
 Oops! The World's Funniest Outtakes (1995)
 For Better or for Worse: The World's Funniest Wedding Disasters (1995)
 The Secrets of the X-Files (1995)
 Countdown to the Emmys (1995)
 Springfield's Most Wanted (1995)
 Billboard Music Awards (1995, 2001–2006)
 Ho! Ho! Ho! TV's All-Time Funniest Christmas Moments (1995)
 Fox's New Year's Eve Live! (1995, 2010, 2012–2013)
 More Secrets of the X-Files (1996)
 USA vs. The World: The Ultimate Gymnastics Competition (1996)
 Shocking Behavior Caught on Tape (two specials; 1999)
 Opening the Lost Tombs: Live from Egypt (1999)
 Train Wrecks (1999)
 Teen Choice Awards (1999–present)
 Getting Away with Murder: The JonBenet Ramsey Mystery (2000)
 Powers of the Paranormal: Live on Stage! (2000)
 Unauthorized Brady Bunch: The Final Days (2000)
 After Diff'rent Strokes: When the Laughter Stopped (2000)
 Surprise Wedding (2000)
 Celebrity Daredevils Live (2002)
 The Michael Jackson Interview: The Footage You Were Never Meant to See (2003)
 Billboard's New Year's Eve Live (2009)
 American Country Awards (2010–2013)
 American Country New Year's Eve Live! (2011)
 Fox's 25th Anniversary Special (2012)
 The All-Star Dog Rescue Celebration (2014–2015)
 Rent: Live (2019)

Fox News Group
 1968: The 25th Anniversary (1993)
 The Royals: Dynasty or Disaster (1993)
 Talkin' It Out: Questions and Answers About the Oklahoma City Bombing (1995)
 Sex & Romance: A Test for the '90s (1995)
 Fox News Reporting (2004–2008)
 Showdown with Larry Elder (2008)

See also
 20th Television Animation
 Sky Vision
 Fox Kids
 Love Productions
 Sky Studios
 Fox Entertainment
 List of programs broadcast by Fox Kids
 Freeform (TV channel)
 Foxtel
 List of programs produced by ABC Signature
 Fox Alternative Entertainment
 Znak & Co

References

Notes

20th Television

20th Television
Television series by Disney